Las Cimas (Spanish: "Summit" or "Top") is an office complex in unincorporated Travis County, Texas, between Austin and West Lake Hills. It previously housed the headquarters of Dell and American Campus Communities.

Las Cimas II and III are owned by Spear Street Capital.

History
Lincoln Property Company developed Las Cimas II and III in 2000 and 2001.

In 2000 Dell announced that it would lease  of space in the Las Cimas office complex to house the company's executive offices and corporate headquarters, which were moving from Round Rock, Texas. 100 senior executives were scheduled to work in the building by the end of 2000. In January 2001 the company leased the space in Las Cimas 2, located along Loop 360. Las Cimas 2 housed Dell's executives, the investment operations, and some corporate functions. After a slowdown in business required reducing employees and production capacity, Dell decided to sublease its offices in two buildings in the Las Cimas office complex. In 2002 Dell announced that it planned to sublease its space to another tenant; the company planned to move its headquarters back to Round Rock once a tenant was secured. By 2003 Dell moved its headquarters back to Round Rock.

Challenger International Ltd. purchased Las Cimas II and III for $63 million in 2002. Challenger merged with CPH Investment Corp. in 2003, so its name changed to Challenger Financial Services Group Ltd. In 2004 Challenger put Las Cimas II and III (together they have  of space) for sale.

In 2006 Triple Net announced that it was selling Las Cimas II and III. At the time, Dell leased the entirety of both buildings and sublet them to several firms, including American Campus Communities, Keller Williams Realty, Sheshunoff Information Services, and Texas Instruments.

In early February 2009 Vitesse Semiconductor Corp. leased  in Las Cimas IV, the newest building in the Las Cimas complex. Intersil Corp. leased  of space in Las Cimas IV later that month. Over half of the space that was leased in the end of February 2009 had been taken in the six preceding months.

In 2010 St. Jude Medical Inc. occupied  in two buildings in Las Cimas. Most of the vacation of space was due to a firm moving its offices to other locations in Greater Austin.

References

External links

 Las Cimas Phase IV

Buildings and structures in Travis County, Texas
Dell